St. Apollinaire may refer to:

People
Apollinaris of Ravenna
Apollinaris (disambiguation)

Geography and churches

Czech Republic
 Church of St. Apollinaire, Prague
Kostel svatého Apolináře (cs) Modlany

France and Quebec
Saint-Apollinaire (disambiguation)
Église Saint-Apollinaire (fr) Meximieux
Saint-Appolinaire, Rhône a commune in the Rhône department in eastern France.

Germany
 St Apollinaris (de) in Düsseldorf
 St Apollinaris (de) in Lindlar
 St. Apollinaris (Obermaubach) in Kreuzau
 Apollinariskirche, Remagen
 St. Apollinaris (Grunewald) in Wermelskirchen
 St. Apollinaris (de) in Winnerath

Italy
 Sant'Apollinare (disambiguation)
 Basilica of Sant'Apollinare in Classe, Ravenna
 Sant’Apollinare Nuovo, Ravenna
 Sant'Apollinare alle Terme Neroniane-Alessandrine, Rome